The women's 100 metre breaststroke SB9 event at the 2014 Commonwealth Games as part of the swimming programme took place on 27 July at the Tollcross International Swimming Centre in Glasgow, Scotland.

The medals were presented by Mohamed Abdul Sattar, president of the Swimming Association of Maldives and the quaichs were presented by Vivian Gungaram, secretary general of the Mauritius Olympic Committee.

Records
Prior to this competition, the existing world and Commonwealth Games records were as follows.

Results

Heats

Finals

References

Women's 100 metre breaststroke SB9
Commonwealth Games
2014 in women's swimming